IFG may refer to:

IFG Group, Irish financial parent company of James Hay Partnership
Impaired fasting glycaemia, or impaired fasting glucose - a pre-diabetic condition
Inferior frontal gyrus, part of the brain's prefrontal cortex
Institute for Government, a United Kingdom-based think tank 
Interframe gap, a transmission pause in computer networking
International Fruit Genetics, a California-based fruit breeding company